Daniel Voß (born 28 March 1971) is a German former water polo player. He competed in the men's tournament at the 1996 Summer Olympics.

See also
 Germany men's Olympic water polo team records and statistics
 List of men's Olympic water polo tournament goalkeepers

References

External links
 

1971 births
Living people
Water polo goalkeepers
German male water polo players
Olympic water polo players of Germany
Water polo players at the 1996 Summer Olympics
Sportspeople from Hamm